Sardar Saab is a 2017 Indian Punjabi-language action film directed by Amit Prasher and written by Daljeet Kalsi. It stars Jackie Shroff, Guggu Gill, Daljeet Kalsi, Neetu Singh, Sudesh Berry, Shivendra Mahal, Karamjit Anmol, Sardar Sohi & Yaad Grewal in the lead roles. A remake of the 2013 Tamil film Thalaivaa, the film released worldwide on 6 January 2017.

Cast 
 Jackie Shroff as Sardar Sahib
 Guggu Gill
 Daljeet Kalsi
 Neetu Singh
 Sudesh Berry
 Shivendra Mahal
 Karamjit Anmol
 Sardar Sohi
 Yaad Grewal
 Saddam Dualle
Manjeet Singh Aulakh

Soundtrack 

The soundtrack of Super used by Millind Gaba, Kaptan Laadi & RDK while the lyrics were written by Millind Gaba & Noddy Singh.

References

External links 
 
 Sardar Saab Trailer
 Sardar Saab OST

Indian action films
Punjabi remakes of Tamil films
Punjabi-language Indian films
2010s Punjabi-language films
2017 action films